Stewton is a village and civil parish in the East Lindsey district of Lincolnshire, England. The population is included in the civil parish of Keddington.

In the Domesday Book of 1086 the village is written as "Stivetone", with 19 households, 3 acres of meadow and 5 acres of woodland.

The Grade II* listed parish church is dedicated to Saint Andrew and dates from the 11th century, although it was rebuilt in 1866 by James Fowler of Louth. In 1902 the west porch was added.

Stewton was the birthplace of William Spavens (1735–99), whose life story 'The Seaman's Narrative' is an important historical source about life in the Royal Navy. In it he describes how he was forced into the Navy by a press gang but later joined a press gang himself.

References

External links

"Stewton Lincolnshire"; A Vision of Britain through Time; retrieved 4 June 2012
"Stewton", Genuki.org.uk. Retrieved 4 June 2012

Villages in Lincolnshire
Civil parishes in Lincolnshire
East Lindsey District